Clowns and Balloons is a circus-themed video game written by Frank Cohen for the Atari 8-bit family and published in 1982 by Datasoft. It is a clone of the 1977 arcade game Circus. A variant of Breakout, the player moves a trampoline to catch a bouncing clown who pops rows of balloons at the top of the screen with his head.

Gameplay

The object of Clowns and Balloons is to move a trampoline under a clown and bounce him high enough into the air to burst all the balloons. The player controls the trampoline's left and right movement with the joystick or paddles.

There is a bonus to score by clearing each row of balloons completely starting from the bottom and working up. If the balloons are not cleared in order, the row will refill. Clowns bounce at different angles depending on where they land on the trampoline.

Reception
Charles Brannon, who reviewed the game for Compute! magazine, liked the game: "The animation remains fairly simple, though smooth. The sound and music are some of the best I've heard. Despite the simple theme, Clowns and Balloons turned out to be great fun, and inspired hours of frenzied joystick twisting."

See also

Other games written by Frank Cohen:
 Cohen's Towers (1983)
 Ghost Chaser (1984)
 Ollie's Follies (1984)
 The Scrolls of Abadon (1984)

References

External links
Review in SoftSide
Review in Page 6

1982 video games
Action video games
Atari 8-bit family games
Atari 8-bit family-only games
Datasoft games
Video game clones
Video games about clowns
Video games developed in the United States